Rock Dell or Rockdell can refer to:

 Rock Dell, Saskatchewan, a community in Canada
 Rock Dell Township, Olmsted County, Minnesota, a township in the United States
 Rockdell Formation, a geologic formation in Tennessee, United States